Atlasta Creek is a stream in Valdez–Cordova Census Area, Alaska, in the United States.

"Atlasta Creek took its name from a local roadhouse, that was named when a pioneer woman said in relief, "At last, a house" after the first house in the area was completed.

See also
 List of rivers of Alaska

References

Rivers of Alaska
Rivers of Copper River Census Area, Alaska
Rivers of Unorganized Borough, Alaska